SS Jared Ingersoll was a Liberty ship built in the United States during World War II. She was named after Jared Ingersoll, an American Founding Father, lawyer, and statesman from Philadelphia, Pennsylvania. He was a delegate to the Continental Congress and a signatory of the Constitution of the United States.

Construction
Jared Ingersoll was laid down on 24 June 1942, under a Maritime Commission (MARCOM) contract, MCE hull 60, by the Bethlehem-Fairfield Shipyard, Baltimore, Maryland; she was sponsored by Mrs. B.N. Ward, the wife of Commander Ward, the Assistant to the Industrial Manager, Fifth Naval District, Baltimore, and was launched on 15 August 1942.

History
She was allocated to American West African Line, Inc., on 25 August 1942. On 13 January 1947, she was laid up in the National Defense Reserve Fleet, Wilmington, North Carolina. She was sold for scrapping on 7 July 1964, to Horton Industries, Inc., for $46,600. She was withdrawn from the fleet on 4 August 1964.

References

Bibliography

 
 
 
 

 

Liberty ships
Ships built in Baltimore
1942 ships
Wilmington Reserve Fleet
Ships named for Founding Fathers of the United States